Ágnes Simor (Hungarian name order Simor Ágnes) (born 23 December 1979 in Budapest) is a Hungarian actress, dancer, who, from 2006 to 2011, was Cultural Head of Tűzraktér Independent Cultural Center, initially "Tűzraktér - Independent Cultural Center", created by Etienne Samin and directed between 2004 and 2005 by Gyevi-Biro Eszter and Etienne Samin.

Life 

Her father is  András Simor (poet), her mother is Éva Dobos (literary translator). She began her dance and theater studies at  Margit Földessy Drama Studio and in the Creative Movement Studio. She has been featured in television productions with her own script. At the high school she was stage manager of English and German theatrical performances and continued her advancement in  theater studies. She graduated from the faculty of literature, aesthetics and drama pedagogy of Eötvös Loránd University of Budapest. At the Budapest Dance and Arts School she obtained her degree in intensive training in contemporary dance. She improved her knowledge in special dances and movement theater styles including Latin American dances and Japanese Butoh dance. Between 2005 and 2011 she was the cultural director of the Independent Cultural Center Tűzraktér; Since her academic years, she has appeared in important artistic groups and independent productions.

Works 

Theatrical works:

With KASZT company 

 2001- Samuel Beckett: Plays - Corvinus University of Budapest
 2001- Tárgyak és Képek (Objects and Pictures) - Corvinus University of Budapest
 2002- Don't Talk! - based on Samuel Beckett - Corvinus University of Budapest

 2003- Hétköznapi Hisztéria (Weekday History) - café scenes - Pszinapszis festival, Budapest
 2003-2008 Hétköznapi Hisztéria (Weekday History) - based on György Petri's poems - Kaleidoszkóp Award Miskolc-Budapest, Corvinus University of Budapest

Puppet show:

2005 - Puppet Opera - Millenáris Padlásszínház (Millenáris Attic Theatre), Budapest

Dance Performances (choreography, dance) 

 2003 - The sun and the moon story - Mu Theatre
 2004 - Jump over my shadow, then jump over myself - Mu Theatre, Budapest Dance School
 2004 - Simpla impro - Szimplakert, Budapest

 2005 - Calavera - Mu Theatre
 2006 - The sun and the moon story - (2-face mask solo) Merlin Theatre, Budapest
 2007- Under Clouds - Roma Self-government
 2008- The sun and the moon story - Tűzraktér, Budapest

 2011- Wo-man - Andaxínház, Budapest
 2011- Performances in Japan:
 Nomades contemporary dance company (Tokyo)
 Kazuo Ohno Festival

 Being connected - solo dance, Yokohama Triennale

 2012- Being connected - solo  - Közép Európa Táncszínház (Central Europe Dance Theater), Budapest

Performances 

 Neighborhood - arts performances at the Opera House, Budspest

 Hungarian Painting Day - Exhibition opening (Atlas Gabor's choreography)
 Bottle Dance - exhibition opening Zsuzsa Cserje (dramaturge, director) collection
 Murányi Zsófia's performance - Gödör Klub, Budapest
 Dancing Fashion Shows for Stiaszny Terézia's outfits

Awards 

 2004: Dont't Talk! - Pécs Délibáb Festival Special Award
 2005: Weekday History - Kaleidoszkóp Festivel, Movement Theatre Grand Prix
 2006: Award of Ministry of Culture 

 2010: Pro Urbe Budapest
 2011: Carnival of Cultures, Berlin - Second Award and invitation to closing ceremonies of the EU Delegation

Sources 
 http://revolutionartua.blogspot.hu/2011/03/our-speakers.html
 http://www.dunapart.net/en/program/schedule.html?cikk_id=5831
 http://issuu.com/art.co/docs/art.co_2011_10

References 

1979 births
Living people
Hungarian stage actresses
Hungarian female dancers
Female dancers